Grsync is a graphical user interface for rsync. rsync is a differential backup and file synchronization tool widely used in Unix-like operating systems.

Grsync is developed with the GTK widget toolkit. Like rsync, Grsync is free and open-source software licensed under the GNU General Public License.

About 
Rsync is a tool for creating backups in Linux systems. It supports backing up local folders, SSH tunneling, delta-only synchronization, and so on.

Grsync adds the ability to use such purposes with a graphical user interface, without rsync's need to learn a complex set of command-line arguments. In some cases, it is easier to backup files with grsync than with rsync. Since version 1.3.0, Grsync has GTK-3 compatibility.

See also

 Back in Time (Linux software)
 luckyBackup

References

External links 
 
 Grsync at SourceForge.net

Internet Protocol based network software
Unix network-related software
Data synchronization
Software that uses GTK